National Park railway station is a station on the North Island Main Trunk that served the area around the town of National Park in New Zealand's Ruapehu District. It was served by KiwiRail's Northern Explorer long distance train between Wellington and Auckland. There is a licensed cafe on the platform.

There was a minor collision in 2007, when one Overlander train reversed into the other.

Scheduled passenger services to National Park railway station were suspended from December 2021 to 25 September 2022.

History
Originally the station and town were called Waimarino (calm waters). On 2 May 1926, the New Zealand Railways renamed the railway station as National Park. This name had come into common usage, due to the station's proximity to Tongariro National Park, and it also served to avoid confusion with other places called Waimarino.

About 1930 a  verandah was added to the station. From 1910 to 1940 there was a Post Office at the station, including a telephone from 1914. There was a tablet and fixed signals. Houses for railway staff and a stationmaster were built between 1908 and 1954. A crossing loop could take 80 wagons and a snowplough was kept at the station.

In the 1960s, National Park became the railhead for the heavy equipment and machinery for the Tongariro Power Scheme Development, with the pumice roads substantially upgraded to take the heavy traffic. The problem of building on the wetland was also noted in 1911, 1943 and, in 1930, the loading bank was described as being in 'a rough state' after use during building of Chateau Tongariro. In 1949  of drainpipes were laid when sidings were extended.

An engine reversing triangle was built in 1912 and remained in 1963, but was overgrown by 1973.

Logging 
The opening of the Main Trunk Line in 1908 created a vast opportunity to log and mill the large trees in the native forests with 30 saw mills and associated bush tramways established in the National Park area alone. With the arrival of caterpillar tractors in the 1930s, the extraction process was accelerated with National Park station having one of the greatest throughputs of timber in New Zealand. Today, only one mill is still operating.

Marton Sash and Door Tramway 
It was powered by an A & G Price 1924 Type Cb 0-4-4-0 from 1932 to 1948, which is now at Ferrymead. The mill opened in 1934. The line was still advertising for staff in 1945. The tramway became part of a  cycleway in 2014.

References

External links 
Photos -

 Waimarino plain in 1904
 building service road on Waimarino plain in 1905
 snow in 1918

Railway stations in New Zealand
Buildings and structures in Manawatū-Whanganui
Railway stations opened in 1886
Rail transport in Manawatū-Whanganui